La ladra is a 2010 Italian television series broadcast on  Rai 1.

Cast

Veronica Pivetti: Eva Marsiglia
Daniela Terreri: Gina
Micol Azzurro: Lola
Lia Tanzi: Andreina
Alessio Chiodini: Lorenzo Marsiglia
Johannes Brandrup: Dante Mistretta
Mohamed Zouaoui: Hafiz
Fabio Sartor: Max
Giancarlo Ratti: commissario Caruso
Gabriele De Luca: Bashir
Sergio Fiorentini: Augusto
Camillo Ventola: Ezio

See also
List of Italian television series

External links
 

Italian television series
RAI original programming